Phil Davies is a former professional tennis player from Australia.

Biography
As a junior, Davies won the boys' doubles title at the 1977 Australian Open, partnering with Peter Smylie.

Davies made all of his Grand Prix appearances in local Australian tournaments. Most notable of those was the 1979 Australian Hard Court Championships, in which he made the second round of the singles and was a losing doubles finalist with Brad Guan. He did, however, play Challenger events in the United States and partnered with American John Hayes in the men's doubles at the 1979 US Open. At the 1979 Australian Open, he made it through the qualifying draw and was beaten in the first round by Tony Roche.

He has run a tennis school in the northern Sydney suburb of Mona Vale since 1987.

Grand Prix career finals

Doubles: 1 (0–1)

References

External links
 
 

Year of birth missing (living people)
Living people
Australian male tennis players
Tennis people from New South Wales
Australian Open (tennis) junior champions
Grand Slam (tennis) champions in boys' doubles
20th-century Australian people